Sascha Maier (born 2 January 1974) is a German former footballer.

References

External links

1974 births
Living people
People from Marbach am Neckar
German footballers
Association football forwards
VfB Stuttgart II players
VfB Stuttgart players
SSV Reutlingen 05 players
VfR Mannheim players
SV Wacker Burghausen players
SV Waldhof Mannheim players
SV Darmstadt 98 players
TSG 1899 Hoffenheim players
SV Elversberg players
Bundesliga players
2. Bundesliga players
SC Pfullendorf players